Ab Zehlu or Ab Zahlu may refer to places in Iran:
 Ab Zehlu, Andika
 Ab Zahlu, Izeh

See also
 Ab Zalu (disambiguation)